Mindjedef was a Prince of ancient Egypt, who lived during the 4th Dynasty. His name means "Enduring Like Min". Min is an Egyptian fertility god.

Family 
Mindjedef was a son of Crown Prince Kawab and Queen Hetepheres II. He was the grandson of Pharaoh Khufu and Meritites I and great-grandson of Sneferu. Mindjedef was born during the reign of his grandfather. Mindjedef was a brother of Queen Meresankh III and uncle of Princes Rawer and Minkhaf II.

It is known that Mindjedef had a wife called Khufuankh ("Khufu lives").

Titles 
Prince Mindjedef held the titles King’s son of his body, Hereditary prince, Treasurer of the King of Lower Egypt, etc.

Burial 
Mindjedef was buried at Giza in mastaba G 7760. Mindjedef and Khufuankh are depicted with a small son in the chapel, but his name is not preserved. His sarcophagus is now at the Metropolitan Museum of Art (acc. no. 54.80a-b).

References

3rd-millennium BC births
Princes of the Fourth Dynasty of Egypt
3rd-millennium BC deaths